The 1940 Amateur World Series was the third Amateur World Series (AWS), an international men's amateur baseball tournament. The tournament was sanctioned by the International Baseball Federation (which titled it the Baseball World Cup as of the 1988 tournament). The tournament took place, for the second consecutive time, in Cuba. It was contested by seven national teams playing twelve games each from September 14 through October 6 in Havana. Cuba won its second, and second consecutive, AWS title.

Results

Final standings

Players
Some players of note who took part in the tournament include:
 
 Connie Marrero (3-2, 1.15 ERA), winner of the tournament most valuable player award
 Pedro Orta (.282), father of journeyman Jorge Orta
 Nap Reyes (.297), future major league player
 Segundo Rodriguez (.433), team batting leader
 
 Stanley Cayasso led the tournament in hits with 19
 Juan Manuel Vallecillo led the tournament in RBIs with 10, and tied for second with doubles 4
 Jose Melendez had a record of 3-0
 Jonathan Robinson (.444) led the tournament in batting average, as well as runs with 14
 
 Stubby Overmire, future major league player
 Hawaii
 L. Kunihisha led the tournament with 7 stolen bases

References
 Bjarkman, Peter, A History of Cuban Baseball

Amateur World Series
Baseball World Cup
1940
Amateur World Series
Amateur World Series
Amateur World Series